Agnidev Chatterjee is an Indian, Bengali film director. His films include Babloo Bachelor, Tere Ane Ss, Jihadd, Gaheen Hriday, Dark Chocolate, A Political Murder, Mrs Sen, 3 Kanya, Charuulata 2011, and Probhu Nashto Hoi Jai. Born in 1965 in Calcutta, he started early in his chosen profession. His association with the Bengal television industry in India for the last thirty years has yielded over 5,000 hours of television programming, including sitcoms, news, current affairs and drama.

Chatterjee's directorial debut film Probhu Noshto Hoi Jai ("Lord Let the Devil Steal My Soul") was nominated for the Golden Crow Pheasant at the Kerala Film Festival. His second film Charuulata 2011 was inspired by Rabindranath Tagore's short story Noshtonirh, which in turn was inspired by the source for the Satyajit Ray classic. Chatterjee's third film 3 Kanya is a diabolical tale of passion, crime, lust, and inevitably retribution. He had directed ten films by the beginning of 2018.

Filmography

As the director

As the producer

Television director 

 Chaudhury Pharmaceuticals (Daily soap) (1987)
 "Noukadubi" (Daily soap) (1993)
 "Din Pratidin" (Daily soap) (2001)
 "Ebar Pujo" (Daily soap) (2001)
 "Voter Lorai Parai Parai" (2001)
 "Jhankar" (2001)
 "Nir Khonje Mon" (Daily soap) (2002)
 "Kon She Alor Shopno Nia" (Daily soap) (2003)
 "Kobe Je Kothay"  (Daily soap) (2003)
 "Kothay Pabo Tare" (Daily soap) (2003)
 "Sargam"(2007)
 "Shanai" (Daily soap) (2007)
 "Prabhani Ei Samay"  (Daily soap) (2007)
 "Kaal" (Daily soap) (2007)
 "Gupto Porar Shupto kotha" (Daily soap) (2008)
 "Ki Ashaye Bandhi Khela Ghar"  (Daily soap) (2009)
 "Dadamoni"  (Daily soap) (2010)
 "MAN ME HAI VISHWAS"  (FOUR EPISODES) (2018)
 "BAJLO TOMAR ALOR BENU"  (Daily soap) (2019)

External links 
 

Living people
Bengali film directors
Bengali film producers
Film directors from Kolkata
Film producers from Kolkata
Indian television directors
21st-century Indian film directors
Year of birth missing (living people)